Gerald Geoffrey Copleston (18 March 1921 – 1999) was an English actor, voice actor, and translator who worked primarily in Italian genre cinema. He appeared in more than one hundred films beginning in 1956, many of which were English-language dubs of European films.

Filmography

Live-action roles

Partial dubbing roles

References

External links 

1921 births
1999 deaths
English male film actors
British expatriates in Italy
Place of death missing
Male actors from Manchester